Miss International 2006, the 46th Miss International pageant, was held both in Tokyo, Japan and Beijing, China. The contestants arrived in Tokyo, Japan on October 12 and the finals was held on November 11, 2006 at the Beijing Exhibition Center in Beijing, China. 53 contestants competed. Precious Lara Quigaman of the Philippines crowned her successor Daniela Di Giacomo of Venezuela.

Results

Placements

Special awards

Contestants

  - Luizanne (Zenny) Donata
  - Karli Smith
  - Pamela Justiniano Saucedo
  - Maria Cláudia Barreto de Oliveira
  - Emily Ann Kiss
  - Chen Qian
  - Karina Guerra Rodriguez
  - Elena Georgiou
  - Katerina Pospisilova
  - Wilma Abreu Nazario
  - Denisse Elizabeth Rodriguez Quiñónez
  - Elham Wagdi Fadel
  - Fethiya Mohammed Seid
  - Karoliina Yläjoki
  - Marie-Charlotte Meré
  - Hiltja Müller
  - Melina Aurelie Meryta
  - Mirna Lissy Salguero Moscoso
  - Lissa Diana Viera Sáenz
  - Koni Lui
  - Sonnalli Seygall
  - Mami Sakurai
  - Rachel Nyameyo
  - Jang Yoon-seo
  - Iris Hng Choy Yin
  - Murielle Desgrelle
  - Alondra del Carmen Robles Dobler
  - Bolortuya Dagva
  - Fabienne Vidoire
  - Claire Beattie
  - Misel Uku
  - Shequita DeLeon Guerrero Bennett
  - Linn Andersen
  - Mayte Sánchez González
  - Lissy Consuelo Miranda Muñoz
  - Denille Lou Valmonte
  - Marta Jakoniuk
  - Sharon Gómez
  - Maurielle Nkouka Massamba
  - Elena Vinogradova
  - Danka Dizdarevic
  - Genecia Luo
  - Dagmar Ivanova
  - Sara Sánchez Torres
  - Gayesha Perera
  - Rebecca Chor Malek
  - Liu Tzu-Hsuan
  - Angel Delight Kileo
  - Vasana Wongbuntree
  - Asena Tugal
  - Inna Goruk
  - Daniela Di Giacomo
  - Vũ Ngọc Diệp

Notes

Withdrawals

Did not compete

  - Sharie Delva
  - Priscilla Amara Marfo
  - Tzoulia Alexandratou
  - Kristia Ramlagan
  - Tehila Mor
 
  - Bendu Ciapha
 
  - Bunita Sunuwar
  - Salmon Faimano
  - Lucy Avril Evangelista (SF World '05)
  - María Alejandra Américo Chacon
  - Sara Dee Harrigfeld

Crossovers

Miss Universe
 2006:  - Shequita Bennett
 2009:  - Elham Wagdi
Miss World
 2005:  - Meryta Melina
Miss Earth
 2005:  - Elham Wagdi
 2007:  - Angel Delight Kileo
Miss Intercontinental
 2007:  - Elham Wagdi (Semi-finalist)
Miss All Nations
 2010:  - Vasana Wongbuntree (3rd runner-up)

Miss Global Beauty Queen
 2009:  - Vasana Wongbuntree (Winner, Miss Photogenic, as Bangkok)
World Miss University
 2007:  - Emily Ann Kiss
Miss Tourism Queen International
 2007:  - Vasana Wongbuntree (1st runner-up)
 2009:  - Gayesha Perera (Miss Talent)
Reinado Internacional del Café
 2012:  - Emily Ann Kiss

References

External links
 Pageantopolis - Miss International 2006

2006
2006 in China
2000s in Beijing
2006 beauty pageants
Beauty pageants in China